Nikanor "Nika" Melia (born 21 December 1979) is a Georgian politician, former chairman of the United National Movement party and former member of Parliament of Georgia. He was a member of parliament of Georgia from United National Movement from 2016 to 2019 and from 2020 to 2021. He holds a master's degree in International Relations from Oxford Brookes University.

Biography
Nikanor Melia was born on 21 December 1979. In 2002, he graduated from the Faculty of Law of the Academy of the Ministry of State Security of Georgia.

In 1996, Melia graduated from Tbilisi Secondary School No. 47. In 2002–03, he was an investigator at the Ministry of Security of Georgia. Graduated from Brooks University in 2006 with a degree in International Relations. In 2007, he worked as an advisor in the Department of Defense and Law Enforcement of the Office of the National Security Council of Georgia. In 2008–09, he worked as a Deputy Head of the National Bureau of Enforcement. In 2009–10, he was the head of the National Bureau of Enforcement. In 2010, he was the head of the National Agency for Execution of Non-custodial Sentences and Probation, a legal entity under public law under the Ministry of Corrections and Legal Assistance of Georgia. In 2010, he was appointed as the head of the Tbilisi Enforcement Bureau of the National Bureau of Enforcement, and in 2010–12 as the chairman of the same bureau.

In 2013–14, he was the governor of Mtatsminda. In 2014, he was a candidate for Tbilisi mayor. Since 2015, he has been the deputy chairman and Acting Chairman of the Tbilisi branch of the United National Movement. In 2016–19, he was a member of the Parliament of Georgia of the ninth convocation by party list, election bloc: "United National Movement". During his time in Parliament he was a member of four parliamentary committees. In 2016–17, he was a member of the Finance and Budget Committee. From 18 to 25 November 2016, he was a member of the Committee on Procedural Issues and Rules. In 2016–17, he was the chairman of the parliamentary fraction "United National Movement". In 2017–19, he was a member of the Defense and Security Committee. In 2017–18, he was a member of the Health and Social Affairs Committee. 

Melia was one of the organizers of the 2019 Georgian protests, which ended with the attempt to storm the parliament building and subsequent violent dispersal of the protests by the special forces. In result, Melia was charged with organising or managing group violence or participating in it. In June 2019, the court rejected prosecution motion for pre-trial detention and ordered Melia to post a bail, wear a monitoring bracelet and also to surrender his passport during the investigation.

Melia was the only opposition candidate to take first place in the first round of the 2020 Georgian parliamentary election, but he boycotted and didn't participate in the second round. He rejected mandate in the parliament with 54 opposition members because of alleged election fraud. On 1 November 2020, Melia was one of the leaders of the opposition rally demanding repeat parliamentary elections. During the demonstration, Melia took off the monitoring bracelet, calling it "the symbol of injustice". In response, the court increased his bail. 

In December 2020, after the resignation of Grigol Vashadze, Melia was elected as the chairman of the United National Movement.

After Melia's refusal to pay the bail, the Tbilisi City Court sentenced him to a pre-trial detention. Prime Minister Giorgi Gakharia wanted to postpone the arrest to avoid political tensions between the government and the opposition, but he failed to achieve an agreement with his party colleagues and subsequently announced his resignation, causing a government crisis. The Ministry of Internal Affairs decided to postpone the operation, but only temporarily before the situation was neutralized. The ruling Georgian Dream party supported Irakli Garibashvili to replace Giorgi Gakharia, and the Parliament voted 89–2 to appoint Garibashvili as the new Prime Minister. On 23 February 2021, special forces and police stormed the UNM office and arrested Melia.

Bail of Nika Melia – 40 000 GEL was transferred by the European Union on 8 May, and the Prosecutor's Office filed a motion to replace Melia's pretrial detention with a release on bail on 9 May. Delegation of European Union in Georgia said in a statement on 8 May: "Today, a bail worth 40.000 GEL was posted to allow for Mr. Melia's release from pre-trial detention. This follows the understanding reached by the political parties on April 19, 2021, in the context of the EU-mediated agreement. We would like to warmly thank two independent organisations who agreed to lend their valuable support in this process: the European Endowment for Democracy (EED) who made the funds available and the Georgian Young Lawyers’ Association (GYLA) who transferred these funds to the authorities." Melia was released from prison by the court decision on May 10.

On 5 October 2021, the Parliament of Georgia approved Melia's request to terminate his parliamentary mandate. Melia's decision was in reaction to the Georgian Dream's withdrawal from the agreement signed with the opposition on the electoral and judicial reforms.

In January 2023, Melia was defeated by Levan Khabeishvili in the United National Movement's internal elections and unseated as the party's chairman. During his campaign, Melia accused members of the old party guard who occupied high positions in the party when it was in power, namely Davit Kezerashvili and Vano Merabishvili, of plotting against him and backing Khabeishvili in an attempt to gain "informal influence" over the party. However, after the elections Melia congratulated Khabeishvili on his victory.

Personal life
He has a son, Sandro Melia (b. 2014). His father, Anzor Melia is a famous doctor in Georgia.

Results in elections

References

External links
 

1979 births
Living people
Alumni of Oxford Brookes University
Members of the Parliament of Georgia
United National Movement (Georgia) politicians
21st-century politicians from Georgia (country)
Politicians from Tbilisi